Chaker Rguiî (born 25 May 1987) in Ben Gardane, is a Tunisian professional footballer who currently plays as a midfielder.

On 26 July 2021, Rguiî joined Saudi club Al-Bukiryah. On 14 July 2022, Rguiî joined Al-Ansar.

References

External links
 

1987 births
Living people
Tunisian footballers
Tunisia international footballers
Tunisian expatriate footballers
ES Zarzis players
Club Africain players
CS Hammam-Lif players
US Ben Guerdane players
Espérance Sportive de Tunis players
Kazma SC players
Al-Kawkab FC players
Al-Bukayriyah FC players
Al-Ansar FC (Medina) players
Tunisian Ligue Professionnelle 1 players
Kuwait Premier League players
Saudi First Division League players
Saudi Second Division players
Expatriate footballers in Kuwait
Expatriate footballers in Saudi Arabia
Tunisian expatriate sportspeople in Kuwait
Tunisian expatriate sportspeople in Saudi Arabia
Association football midfielders
People from Medenine Governorate
People from Ben Gardane